Patrulla 81 is a Regional Mexican band originally from the state of Durango. Group member José Ángel Medina formed the group in 1981. In 2004, the group released Cómo Pude Enamorarme de Ti, a hit in both the United States and Mexico. In December 2007, the band released a new album, A Mi Ley, featuring the single "Te Quiero Mucho." Patrulla 81's Quiéreme Más reached No. 1 on the Billboard Top Latin Albums chart in March 2009. In late 2009, the band released Sin Ti No Vive, which debuted on Billboard's Regional Mexican chart at No. 1.

On November 11, 2020, José Ángel Medina, vocalist and leader of Patrulla 81, died from complications of COVID-19. He had been battling the virus since October 16.

his son Jose Angel Medina Jr. (known as Filo) as first-born, keyboardist and producer of Patrulla 81 for over 20 years took over the reins of the band.

Discography
2004: Como Pude Enamorarme De Ti
2004: Soy De Durango: Sus Inicios Vol. 1
2004: En Vivo Desde Dallas, Texas
2005: Soy Duranguense 100%
2005: Divinas
2006: Como Me Haces Falta Y Muchos Exitos Mas
2006: Tierra Extraña
2006: 20 Reales Superexitos
2006: La Mejor De La Coleccion
2006: Los Super Exitos Payaso Loco
2007: Tu/Yo
2007: A Mi Ley
2007: En Concierto
2008: Corridos Duranguenses
2008: La Historia
2009: Quiéreme Más
2009: Sin Ti No Vivo
2009: Hola soy Dora
2009: Seria Diamanta: 30 Super Exitos
2009: Sus Mejores Exitos
2009: Coleccion Privada: Las 20 Exclusivas
2010: Te Pido Perdon
2011: Como El Fenix
2012: Se Supone
2012: Iconos: 25 Exitos
2013 (April): En Vivo
2013 (October): Quiero Saber De Ti
2014: Mi Amor
2017 Todo Se Paga
2021 Cultura Duranguense

Singles
2009 Quiéreme Más
2009 Sin Ti No Vivo
2011 A Veces
2012 Se Supone
2016 He Nacido Para Ti
2020 Ya No Puedo Olvidarte
2020 Pense
2020 Mi Virgen Ranchera
2021 Celoso (ft. Montéz De Durango)
2021 No Aprendí A Olvidar (ft. Montéz De Durango)
2021 ¿Que Voy Hacer?
2022 Amor Y Lagrimas

References

The best song

Duranguense music groups
Mexican musical groups
Universal Music Latin Entertainment artists